Kunje is a town and commune in the municipality of Kuito, province of Bié, Angola.

It is the home town of UNITA President Isaías Samakuva. It is also home to a considerable amount of unexploded land mines.

References

Populated places in Bié Province
Communes in Bié Province